Hildoceratinae is an extinct subfamily of cephalopods belonging to the family Hildoceratidae. Ammonites of this subfamily had shells with elliptical or quadrate whorl section with keel or tricarinate, bisulcate venter. Ribs were variable, from falcate to strongly angled and from fine to strong. They can be interrupted by spiral groove in midlateral part of the shell. While some species can be smooth, strongly ribbed ones can have tubercules. Microconchs have short lapplets that is in its shape similar to the shape of growth lines in spiral midlateral groove.

Genera 

 Hildaites Buckman, 1921
 Orthildaites Buckman, 1923
 Cingolites Sassaroli et Venturi, 2010
 Hildoceras Hyatt, 1867
 Urkutites Géczy, 1967
 Parahildaites Blaison, 1967
 Mercaticeras Buckman, 1913
 Hildaitoides Hillebrandt, 1987
 Atacamiceras Hillebrandt, 1987
 Neolioceratoides Cantaluppi, 1970

Alternative classification 
Genera Praemercaticeras Venturi, 1981, Mercaticeras Buckman, 1913, Pseudomercaticeras Merla, 1932, Merlaites Gabilly, 1974, and Crassiceras Merla, 1932 have also been classified as belonging to a separate subfamily Mercaticeratinae Guex, 1974.

Distribution
Members of this subfamily lived from the upper Pliensbachian to upper Toarcian stages of early Jurassic. Distribution has been worldwide.

References 

Hildoceratidae
Early Jurassic ammonites
Ammonites of Asia
Ammonites of Africa
Ammonites of Europe
Ammonites of South America
Ammonites of North America
Prehistoric animal subfamilies
Toarcian life